Manjusri Misra is an Indian engineer. She is a Tier 1 Canada Research Chair in Sustainable Biocomposites at the University of Guelph's School of Engineering. Misra is also the lead scientist at U of G's Bioproducts Discovery and Development Centre and a Fellow of the American Institute of Chemical Engineers and the Royal Society of Chemistry.

Early life and education
Misra was born in India into a family of academics. She received her undergraduate and post-graduate degrees from Utkal University before completing her post-doctoral work in Germany, the United States, and Canada.

Career
Following her PhD, Misra was a Senior Lecturer at Utkal University and a Visiting adjunct professor at Michigan State University. While at Michigan State, Misra worked in the Department of Chemical Engineering and Materials Science where she began her research project "Sustainable Biodegradable Green Nanocomposites From Bacterial Bioplastic For Automotive Applications." She was also an editor of the CRC Press volume, "Natural Fibers, Biopolymers and Biocomposites," in 2005.

Misra eventually joined the faculty of the School of Engineering and the Department of Plant Agriculture at the University of Guelph (U of G) in 2008. Upon joining the institution, Misra was appointed president of the BioEnvironmental Polymer Society and served as an editor for various journals. She also edited the American Scientific Publishers volume "Packaging Nanotechnology" in 2009. Following this, Misra received the Jim Hammar Memorial Award from the BioEnvironmental Polymer Society and the 2017 American Institute of Chemical Engineers Andrew Chase Division Award in Chemical Engineering as an individual with "significant chemical engineering contributions in the forest products and related industries." During her tenure at U of G, Misra co-directed the Bioproducts Discovery and Development Centre with her husband which aimed to produce bio-based, sustainable materials that lower greenhouse gas emissions and reduce the impact of plastics. In 2019, her efforts were recognized with the Synergy Award for Innovation from the Natural Sciences and Engineering Research Council of Canada.

In December 2020, Misra was named a Tier 1 Canada Research Chair in Sustainable Biocomposites. She was also recognized by the Women's Executive Networks as one of the Most Powerful Women for 2020. She was specifically recognized for being a "world leader in the development of novel bio-based composites and nanocomposites made from agricultural and forestry resources." The following year, Misra received a Lifetime Achievement Award from the BioEnvironmental Polymer Society for "outstanding contributions to advancing the field of biopolymers, bio-based composite materials."

Awards, honours and distinctions 
2021                   Lifetime Achievement Award, BioEnvironmental Polymer Society (BEPS)

2020                   Canada Research Chair (CRC) Tier 1 – Sustainable Biocomposites, Natural Science and Engineering Research Council of Canada (NSERC)

2020                   Canada's Most Powerful Women: Top 100 Awards – Manulife Science and Technology Category, Women's Executive Networks (WXN), Canada

2020                   Fellow, Society of Plastic Engineers (SPE), USA

2020                   CEPS Undergraduate Supervision Award, College of Engineering and Physical Sciences (CEPS), University of Guelph, Canada

2020                   Fellow, American Institute of Chemical Engineers (AIChE), USA

2019                   The Prestigious “Glory of India” (Bharat Jyoti) Award, India International Friendship Society.

2019                   Fellow, Royal Society of Chemistry, UK        

2019                   Woman of Distinction on Science, Technology, Engineering & Math (STEM): Guelph YMCA-YWCA Women of Distinction, Canada

2018                   NSERC Synergy Award for Innovation, Natural Sciences and Engineering Research Council, Canada

2017                   Andrew Chase Forest Products Division Award, American Institute of Chemical Engineers (AIChE), USA

2017                   Featured Canadian Author

Two publications chosen for ACS Publications Open Access Virtual Issue “Hot Materials in a Cool Country” featuring articles authored by Canadians to celebrate the 100th meeting of

the Canadian Chemistry Conference

2016                   University of Guelph's Innovation of the Year Award, Canada

                          The award is for the creation of the 100% Compostable Bio-composite Resin using coffee chaff (waste stream of coffee roasting industry) for single-serve coffee pods. More awards for

this innovation found here: http://purpod100.com/awards/

2014                   Composites Part A Most Highly Cited Paper Award

"Characterization of natural fiber surfaces and natural fiber composites", selected for the award which highlights that the paper has truly generated interest and awareness within the

composites community

2012                   Jim Hammar Memorial Service Award, BioEnvironmental Polymer Society (BEPS), USA

Personal life 
Misra is married to Amar Mohanty.

References

External links

Living people
Indian women engineers
Utkal University alumni
Academic staff of Utkal University
Academic staff of the University of Guelph
Canada Research Chairs
Michigan State University faculty
Year of birth missing (living people)